Malcolm J. Brenner (born 9 May 1951) is an American author from New Jersey, journalist, and zoophile; He is best known for his controversial novel Wet Goddess (2009), about a love affair between a college student and a bottlenose dolphin in the 1970s. As a journalist, he has covered local news in New Mexico and Florida since the early 1990s.

Career in journalism

In the 1990s, Brenner worked as an investigative reporter covering the Navajo Nation and surrounding area. A 1998 article on the American Indian Movement (AIM) and Russell Means which Brenner wrote for the Gallup Independent is featured on the AIM website.

From 1992 to 1994, Brenner worked at the Farmington Daily Times. After being terminated, Brenner filed a federal lawsuit claiming that he had been terminated for practicing Wicca.

Wet Goddess

Since 2010, Brenner has gained international notoriety for his novel, Wet Goddess. The novel details several months in the life of fictional college student Zachary Zimmerman, in which the protagonist meets a dolphin named Ruby at a local theme park and falls in love with her. Brenner claims the book is autobiographical, and based on a series of events that happened to him in the 1970s. In an article in the Huffington Post, Brenner said: "I wrote this book for dolphins because we are mistreating these animals by keeping them in captivity."

Zoophile
Brenner claims to have had sex with a female dolphin named Dolly in the 1970s. Describing the experience, he stated they “stared into each others eyes” for moments after they made love and they tried seven different poses. He is a zoophile activist.

Works

 Say "Rooo-beee!" (1974), Mind in the Waters, A Book to Celebrate the Consciousness of Whales and Dolphins, assembled by Joan McIntyre
 The Wet Aliens (May 1978), Future Life
 Making Waves (October 1978), Penthouse
 Whale Museum Surfaces (July 1979), Future Life
 Dolphin (November 1979), Future Life
 Your God Isn't Big Enough – An Interview with John Lilly (August 1980), Future Life
 Interview – Poul Anderson (May 1981), Future Life
 Attack of the Laughing Warthogs (March 1981), Future Life
 Nikola Tesla – The Man Who Turned on the World (November 1981), Future Life
 Walkers bring peace message to Gallup (May 4, 1995), Global Emergency Alert Response 2000, originally published in The Gallup Independent
 The Us-Them Dichotomy (1995), Witchcraft Today IV. Living Between Two Worlds: Challenges of the Modern Witch
  AIM seeks distance from Russell Means (January 5, 1998), The Gallup Independent
 Shiprock Miners Plot Radiation Act Amendments (January 26, 1998), originally published in The Gallup Independent
 Air, earth and water: Former miner was contaminated by uranium three ways (January 26, 1998), originally published in The Gallup Independent
 Volunteers Use Straw To Build Home For 86-Year-Old Woman (May 10, 1998), The Seattle Times, originally published in The Gallup Independent
 Navajo Ethics Investigator (August 1998), Investigative Reporters & Editors, originally published in The Gallup Independent
 A Witch among the Navajos (Summer 1998), Gnosis
 The Decline and Fall of Zuni Arts and Crafts Enterprise (October 1998), Investigative Reporters & Editors, originally published in The Gallup Independent
 Premium hikes leave self-employed uninsured (January 28, 2003), Charlotte Sun
 Wet Goddess (2009)
 Masters of the Garden (September 2011), Harbor Style

Awards

 1992 – New Mexico Associated Press Managing Editors Awards: First Place, Investigative
 1993 – New Mexico Press Association: Second Place, Columns
 1994 – New Mexico Associated Press Managing Editors Awards: First Place, Columns
 1995 – New Mexico Associated Press Managing Editors Awards: Best of Show and First Place, Investigative
 1996 – New Mexico Associated Press Managing Editors Awards: First Place, Investigative
 1996 – New Mexico Associated Press Managing Editors Awards: First place, Spot News Photo 
 1998 – New Mexico Press Association: First Place, News Writing
 1998 – New Mexico Associated Press Managing Editors Awards: First Place, Columns
 2004 – Florida Society of Newspaper Editors: Honorable Mention
 2004 – National Newspaper Association: Best Business Story 
 2004 – National Newspaper Association: Honorable Mention, Best Breaking News Story

References
 

Living people
Jewish American journalists
People from Perth Amboy, New Jersey
American newspaper reporters and correspondents
American Wiccans
20th-century American novelists
20th-century American male writers
1951 births
21st-century American novelists
American male novelists
American sexuality activists
21st-century American male writers
Novelists from New Jersey
Wiccan novelists
20th-century American non-fiction writers
21st-century American non-fiction writers
American male non-fiction writers
Wiccans of Jewish descent
21st-century American Jews
Zoophilia